The Princess and the Call Girl  is a 1984 American erotic comedy drama film directed by Radley Metzger and based on  a French story, Frontispiece, by Pierre Serbie, that is similar to Mark Twain novel The Prince and the Pauper.

Plot
Two women, who look alike, one very rich and one very poor, decide to briefly switch roles to see the consequences.

Cast 

 Carol Levy as Audrey Swallow/Lucy Darling
 Victor Bevine	as Steve
 Shannah Hall as Diane
 Chris Beach as Calvin
 Noel Cohen as Andrew
 Christina Swing as Vanessa
 Scott Plank as Stanley
 Steve Gadler as Herb

Reception
Film reviewer Gary Morris notes that the star of The Princess and the Call Girl film, Carol Levy, has some "charming moments". The film, according to another reviewer, is "cheerfully fluffy and consistently erotic ... outside of his Henry Paris titles, [the film] stands as Metzger's funniest achievement ...  a fitting epilogue for the age of sexual freedom; they may not make 'em like this anymore, but as long as these films continue to be appreciated, viewers can relive the experience and have quite a few good, hearty laughs along the way".

Notes
According to one film reviewer, Radley Metzger's films, including those made during the Golden Age of Porn (1969–1984), are noted for their "lavish design, witty screenplays, and a penchant for the unusual camera angle". Another reviewer noted that his films were "highly artistic — and often cerebral ... and often featured gorgeous cinematography". Film and audio works by Metzger have been added to the permanent collection of the Museum of Modern Art (MoMA) in New York City.

References

External links
 The Princess and the Call Girl at  MUBI (related to The Criterion Collection)
 

American erotic drama films
American sex comedy films
American comedy-drama films
Films directed by Radley Metzger
1984 films
1980s erotic drama films
1980s sex comedy films
1984 comedy-drama films
1980s English-language films
1980s American films